Montholon is a commune in the department of Yonne, central France. The municipality was established on 1 January 2017 by merger of the former communes of Aillant-sur-Tholon (the seat), Champvallon, Villiers-sur-Tholon and Volgré.

See also 
Communes of the Yonne department

References 

Communes of Yonne